One Woman's Live Journey is a live album released by British-Australian singer Olivia Newton-John. It was released by Festival Mushroom Records on 19 September 2000 in Australia. Dedicated to  Newton-John's mother Irene, the album is a recording of her concert at the Trump Taj Mahal in Atlantic City, New Jersey on 26 and 27 August 1999.

Critical reception

AllMusic editor Charlotte Dillon rated the album three and a half stars out of five and wrote that "though a live album, this Australia-only release is still up to grade and a real pleasure to listen to thanks to the unfailing singing talents of Olivia Newton-John."

Track listing

Charts

Release history

References

Olivia Newton-John live albums
2000 live albums